Gonzalo Bettini (born 26 September 1992) is an Argentine professional footballer who plays as a right-back for Sarmiento.

Career

Huracán
On 27 June 2019, Bettini joined Club Atlético Huracán on a one-year contract.

Honours
Rosario Central
 Copa Argentina: 2017–18

References

External links

1992 births
Living people
Argentine people of Italian descent
Association football defenders
Argentine footballers
Argentine Primera División players
Primera Nacional players
Club Atlético Banfield footballers
Rosario Central footballers
Club Atlético Huracán footballers
Central Córdoba de Santiago del Estero footballers
Club Atlético Sarmiento footballers
Footballers from Buenos Aires